Americanism was, in the years around 1900, a political and religious outlook attributed to some American Catholics and denounced as heresy by the Holy See.

In the 1890s, European "continental conservative" clerics detected signs of modernism or classical liberalism, which Pope Pius IX had condemned in the Syllabus of Errors in 1864, among the beliefs and teachings of many members of the American Catholic hierarchy, who denied the charges.

The long-term result was that the Irish Catholics who largely controlled the Catholic Church in the United States increasingly demonstrated total loyalty to the Pope, and suppressed traces of liberal thought in the Catholic colleges. At bottom, the conflict was cultural, as the continental conservative Europeans, angered at the heavy attacks on the Catholic Church in Germany, France and other countries, moved to stamp out the individualist attitude in America.

In Europe
During the French Third Republic, which began in 1870, the power and influence of French Catholicism steadily declined. The French government passed laws bearing more and more stringently on the Church, and the majority of French citizens did not object. Indeed, they began to look toward legislators and not to the clergy for guidance.

Observing this, and encouraged by the action of Pope Leo XIII, who, in 1892 called on French Catholics loyally to accept the Republic, several young French priests set themselves to stop the decline in Church power. They determined that because the Church was predominantly sympathetic to the monarchists and hostile to the Republic, and because it held itself aloof from modern philosophies and practices, people had turned away from it. The progressive priests believed that the Church did too little to cultivate individual character, and put too much emphasis on the routine side of religious observance. They also noted that Catholicism was not making much use of modern means of propaganda, such as social movements, the organization of clubs, or the establishing of settlements. In short, the Church had not adapted to modern needs, and these priests endeavored to correct this. They began a domestic apostolate which had for one of its rallying cries,  ("Let us go to the people"). They agitated for social and philanthropic projects, for a closer relationship between priests and parishioners, and for general cultivation of personal initiative, both in clergy and in laity. Not unnaturally, they looked for inspiration to America. There they saw a vigorous Church among a free people, with priests publicly respected, and with a note of aggressive zeal in every project of Catholic enterprise.

Isaac Hecker

In the 1890s, this issue was brought forcefully to the attention of European Catholics by Comtesse de Ravilliax's translation of a biography of Isaac Thomas Hecker by Paulist father Walter Elliott, with the introduction by Abbé Felix Klein drawing the most ire from the Vatican. His biography, written in English by the Paulist Father Elliott in 1891, was translated into French six years later and proved an inspiration to the French. Father Hecker, commonly known as "The Yellow Dart," had been dead for years at this point and had never been viewed by the Pope with disfavor. This translation of Hecker's biography and Abbé Klein's introduction to the book made him appear to have been much more of a radical than he in fact was.

Hecker had sought to reach out to Protestant Americans by stressing certain points of Catholic teaching, but Pope Leo XIII understood this effort as a watering down of Catholic doctrine. Hecker also had used terms such as "natural virtue," which to the pope suggested the Pelagian heresy. Because members of the Paulist Fathers took promises but not the vows of religious orders, many concluded that Hecker denied the need for external authority.

The French liberals particularly admired Father Hecker for his love of modern times and modern liberty and his devotion to liberal Catholicism. Indeed, they took him as a kind of patron saint. Inspired by Father Hecker's life and character, the activist French priests undertook the task of persuading their fellow-priests to accept the political system, and then to break out of their isolation, put themselves in touch with the intellectual life of the country, and take an active part in the work of social amelioration. In 1897, the movement received a new impetus when Monsignor Denis J. O'Connell, former Rector of the Pontifical North American College in Rome, spoke on behalf of Father Hecker's ideas at the Catholic Congress in Fribourg.

Opposition
Some Catholics complained to the Pope, and in 1898, Abbé Charles Maignen wrote an ardent polemic against the new movement called  ("Is Father Hecker a Saint?"). The European conservatives were reinforced by German American Catholic bishops in the Midwest, who were distrustful of the Irish, who increasingly dominated the American Catholic Church. Arthur Preuss (1871–1934) the foremost German Catholic theologian in the United States, was an outspoken enemy, filling his scholarly journal Fortnightly Review with attacks.

Many powerful Vatican authorities also opposed the "Americanist" tendency. Pope Leo XIII was reluctant to chastise the American Catholics, whom he had often praised for their loyalty and faith. In 1899 he wrote Cardinal Gibbons, "It is clear...that those opinions that, taken as a whole, some designate as 'Americanism' cannot have our approval."

Suppression

In the 1895 encyclical  ("Wide Expanse of the Ocean"), Pope Leo XIII indicated a generally positive view of the American Church, commenting mostly on the success of Catholicism in the US but also noting the view that the Church "would bring forth more abundant fruits if, in addition to liberty, she enjoyed the favor of the laws and the patronage of the public authority." Leo warned the American church hierarchy not to support this unique system of separation of church and state.

In 1898, Leo lamented for America where church and state are "dissevered and divorced", and wrote of his preference for a closer relationship between the Catholic Church and the State, along European lines.

Finally, in his letter  (January 22, 1899; "Witness to Our Benevolence") addressed to Cardinal James Gibbons, Archbishop of Baltimore, Leo condemned other forms of Americanism. Catholicism had long allowed nations to tolerate other religions, but the Church believes that the Catholic Faith must be favored when possible.

Pope Leo XIII also expressed concerns about the Cultural liberalism of some American Catholics: he pointed out that the faithful could not decide doctrine for themselves. He emphasized that Catholics should obey the magisterial teaching authority of the Church. In general, he deemed it dangerous to expose children to schools that would prove to be detrimental to their Christian upbringing. The Pope derided the idea that all opinions should be aired publicly, as he felt certain speech could harm general morality. He also condemned the biography of Hecker and Americanism.

This document condemned the following doctrines or tendencies:

 Undue insistence on interior initiative in the spiritual life, as leading to disobedience
 Attacks on religious vows, and disparagement of the value of religious orders in the modern world
 Minimizing Catholic doctrine
 Minimizing the importance of spiritual direction

The brief did not assert that Hecker and the Americans had held any unsound doctrine on the above points. Instead, it merely stated that if such opinions did exist, the local hierarchy was to eradicate them.

American response

They asserted that Hecker had never countenanced the slightest departure from Catholic principles in their fullest and most strict application.

The disturbance caused by the condemnation was slight; almost the entire laity and a considerable part of the clergy were unaware of this affair. The pope's brief did end up strengthening the position of the conservatives in France. Leo's pronouncements effectively ended the Americanist movement and curtailed the activities of American progressive Catholics. Historian Thomas McAvoy argues there were grave long-term negative effects on the intellectual life of American Catholics.

Bernard McQuaid, bishop of Rochester, was a forerunner of the Americanism dispute. He was quick to recognize the mingling of liberalism and Catholicism—which he called "false Americanism"—and distinguish it from living the ideals of republicanism and democracy—"true Americanism." McQuaid was very suspicious of secret societies, non-Catholic schooling, and even some of his fellow bishops. He was particularly concerned about John Ireland, John Keane, and James Cardinal Gibbons, all of whom McQuaid considered "too conciliatory to Protestant-minded America."

John Ireland, archbishop of Saint Paul, Minnesota and a foremost modernizer, had to walk on eggshells to avoid condemnation for his views. Ireland, joined by John J. Keane, archbishop of Dubuque, sought to adapt the social and religious values of the Catholic Church to American political and cultural values, especially religious liberty, separation of church and state, cooperation with non-Catholics, and lay participation in ecclesiastical decisionmaking. Many of his ideas were implicitly condemned by Pope Leo XIII's  (1899) as a heresy and Americanism. Nevertheless, Ireland continued to promote his views. When similar European views were condemned by Pope Pius X's  (1907), Ireland actively campaigned against what the pope declared the heresy of modernism. This apparently inconsistent behavior stemmed from Ireland's concept of a "golden mean" between "ultraconservatism", rendering the Church irrelevant, and "ultraliberalism," discarding the Church's message.

Americanization
Others, such as Orestes Brownson—an abolitionist Catholic public intellectual—were not satisfied with the system of national parishes. Considered an Americanizer, he advocated for immigrants to believe their Catholic identities supersede national divides and personally opposed training priests in the ethnically divided American seminaries. Bishop John Hughes believed that Brownson was part of a "'club' of liberal intellectuals...who wanted to Americanize the church". He publicly denounced Brownson for giving the 1860 commencement address at Fordham University.

See also
19th-century history of the Catholic Church in the United States
Cafeteria Catholicism

References

Further reading
 Murray, John Courtney. Religious liberty: Catholic struggles with pluralism (1993) 278 pages excerpts and text search
 McAvoy, Thomas T. The Americanist Heresy in Roman Catholicism 1895-1900 (1963) University of Notre Dame Press.
 McAvoy, Thomas T. "The Catholic Minority after the Americanist Controversy, 1899-1917: A Survey", Review of Politics, Jan 1959, Vol. 21 Issue 1, pp 53–82 in JSTOR
 Smith, Elwyn A. "The Fundamental Church-State Tradition of the Catholic Church in the United States." Church History 1969 38(4): 486-505. in JSTOR
 Thomas, Samuel J. "The American Periodical Press and the Apostolic Letter 'Testem Benevolentiae", Catholic Historical Review, July 1976, Vol. 62 Issue 3, pp 408–423

External links
Testem benevolentiae nostrae
Longinqua
Catholic Encyclopedia article on Testem Benevolentiae
Phantom Heresy? Americanist Crisis and the U.S. Roman Catholic Church
Americanism: Then and Now
Americanism — A Phantom Heresy?
Shameless Popery: The Trouble with "Americanism"

Heresy in the Catholic Church
19th-century Catholicism
Pope Leo XIII
Catholic Church in the United States
Holy See–United States relations
Liberal Catholicism